Brian Springer (born 1959) is an American documentarian and new media artist who works primarily in video, sound, and performance.

Springer spent a year searching for footage by intercepting raw network satellite television feeds not intended for public consumption. The result of his research was Spin.  This 1995 feature-length documentary provides insights into how television is used by the industry and by politicians to mold and distort the American public's view of reality. Springer produced Spin as a follow-up to Feed (1992), for which he also provided raw satellite footage.

In 2007, Springer released another documentary, The Disappointment: Or, The Force of Credulity. He earned a M.F.A. in art from the University of California, Santa Barbara and his works have been shown at the Hammer Museum in Los Angeles, the Whitney Museum in New York City, the Institute of Contemporary Arts in London, the Centre Pompidou in Paris, and ZKM in Germany.

References

External links 
 Brian Springer in the Video Data Bank
 

1959 births
Living people
American documentary filmmakers
American television directors
American film directors
American multimedia artists
University of California, Santa Barbara alumni